Jerry Harris or Gerry Harris may refer to:
Gerry Harris (1935–2020), English footballer
Jerry Harris (artist) (1945–2016), American artist and writer
Jerry Harris (scientist) (fl. 1970s–present), American geophysicist
Gerry Harris (academic) (born 1957), British academic
Jerry Harris (cheerleader) (born 1999), American television personality
Jerry D. Harris, United States Air Force general

See also
 Jerry Harrison